The Shoe4Africa Children's Hospital is the first dedicated public children's hospital of its kind in East & Central Africa, and was the second dedicated public children's hospital in Sub-Saharan Africa after the Red Cross War Memorial Children's Hospital in Cape Town, South Africa which was opened in 1956 through public subscription as a memorial to soldiers lost in the Second World War. 
Groundbreaking took place on December 31, 2012, construction began on July 7, 2013, and the foundation stone was set on August 21, 2013. The initial capacity was a 105-bed hospital and it opened its doors to the public on 12 August 2015 and has upgraded, year by year, to 200-bed establishment in 2018. The institution is a teaching hospital partnering with the Moi University. The site is in the center of Eldoret, the capital of Uasin Gishu county, Kenya. This hospital seeks to help an under-served community where one in one in eight children die before their 5th birthday and 2/3rds of these deaths are from treatable/preventable diseases. 80% of these children will have never seen a healthcare provider in their short life.  With ISO 9001:2008 status and 200-beds the hospital aims to bring quality healthcare to the public sector.

The hospital is the landmark project of Shoe4Africa (www.shoe4africa.org), a New York charity focused on creating better health and education outcomes in Eastern Africa. Donors have included notable names such as Cristiano Ronaldo, Natalie Portman, Rosario Dawson, Ryan Reynolds, Hugh Jackman, Mark Webber, and Anthony Edwards. Celebrity donors help The charity has also raised significant funding for the hospital, and other building projects, through individual donations and the efforts of runners that run marathons and other road races throughout the world and raise funds through their participation.

In 2015, Dr. John Kibosia, CEO of Kenya's second largest national hospital (Moi Teaching Referral), said the new facility will be the only one of its kind in the East & Central African region. "It will be another milestone for the hospital and the health sector in the country." The project is expected to cost, at the final completion, Two billion Kenya shillings Link
Moi Teaching and Referral Hospital, Kenya's second largest national hospital governs the Shoe4Africa Children's Hospital, that is built within its government grounds.

On January, 7th 2016, Toby Tanser (Shoe4Africa CEO) and Dr. Wilson Aruasa (MTRH CEO) laid the foundation stone for the 'Eat & Run' kitchen. The new, dedicated kitchen facility is located next to the Shoe4Africa Children's Hospital and provides child-friendly nutrition for malnourished patients of the hospital. Funding for the kitchen was secured by the German chapter of Shoe4Africa through a charity run of 500 school kids of the Grandlschule (Grandlschule), a primary school based in Munich, Germany.

In the Summer of 2017, annexed buildings were constructed to alleviate the overflowing hospital.  The first to be used as Immunization Center for healthy children and HIV patients, the second as a large play room to complement the four interior playrooms.  In 2018 a basketball court was added, and opened by the world record holder in the marathon, Mary Keitany, servicing the patients and the medical school students.  The charity announced that a soccer pitch would be the next edition to help kids rehabilitate and in May 2019, the men's marathon world record holder, Eliud Kipchoge, opened the astro-turf soccer pitch. Later in the year the Kuunga Mkono classrooms were added to the hospital so that the children won't fall behind in education whilst hospitalized, making the institution the first hospital in Africa to have annexed children's classrooms inside its seven acre complex.

Addressing the rising cases of pediatric cancer in the sub-Sahara, Shoe4Africa's founder, Toby Tanser, decided in 2019 to construct a 152-bed pediatric cancer hospital next door to the children's facility to be named The Shoe4Africa Juli Anne Perry Children's Cancer Hospital. “Shoe4Africa, is self-sufficient, providing multi-specialty services to pediatrics,” explained Dr. Mandi, a paediatric gastrologist adding that “pediatric cancer has become a major problem” and that a new center would improve on the solitary 30-bed ward space that exists inside the general children's hospital today.

On December the 24th, 2021, Paula Radcliffe joined a host of Kenyan runners to run from the Equator to the Shoe4Africa Children's Hospital to break ground in the next field where sub-Saharan Africa's 1st children's cancer hospital with be erected.  Isla Lough, Paula's 14-year-old daughter and a cancer survivor, threw the first shovel alongside a Kenyan girl, Sharon, into the ground watched by a host of Olympians and the 'father' of Kenyan running, Kipchoge Keino.

In 2022, Shoe4Africa celebrated treating its millionth patient. The 2022 London Marathon winner Amos Kipruto, The 2022 Boston and 2022 New York Marathon winner Evans Chebet, and the 2022 Chicago Marathon winner Benson Kipruto, gathered with 20 other elite athletes from the 2Running club to celebrate the milestone with the children.

Aces for Africa 
Aces for Africa is a charity tennis tournament to benefit the Shoe4Africa Hospital founded by Zeynep Inanli and David Siegel in 2016. The inaugural competition was held in May 2016 at the CityView venue on Long Island, New York.  Whitney Tilson and Harel Srugo, a former Israeli Davis Cup player, defeated Ron Sussman and Jonas Mouly in the finals. In 2017 Sussman and Mouly took revenge winning the title beating Steve Sussman and Robert Jendelund, a former pro player from Sweden.

References

Hospitals in Kenya